Christopher Hogan is an American actor and comedian, most notable for his membership in the recurring cast of comedians on MADtv and for the character of Aubrey Pitman, one of Dick Solomon's students, on 3rd Rock from the Sun.

Early life
Hogan grew up in Eastchester, New York, and went to Trinity College, in Hartford, Connecticut, graduating in the class of 1985. While at Trinity, he was a member of the Alpha Delta Phi fraternity.

Career

MADtv
Hogan joined the cast of MADtv in 1997, as a repertory performer, for the third season. He is remembered for playing characters  who could only wrestle the infamous response, "He looka like a man" from Alex Borstein's Ms. Swan, whether it would be a fast food clerk, a police officer, or his Fox Mulder character. Hogan's other characters included Miguel O'Reilly (New at Six), Vonda Parker (Parker Sisters), and public accountant Milton Cladwell. However, Hogan is most remembered for succeeding David Herman as the colorful El Asso Wipo from the Superstars of the Mexican Wrestling Federation Theatre. El Asso struck fear into the hearts of many with his famed one line threat, "I will break their back like so, WITH MY KNEE!" After one season on the show, Hogan left MADtv at the conclusion of season three.

Characters
 El Asso Wipo (Mexican Wrestling Federation)
 Miguel O'Reilly (News at Six)
 Milton Cladwell
 Vonda Parker (Parker Sisters)

Impressions
 Andrew McCarthy
 Anthony Head
 David Duchovny (as himself and as Fox Mulder from The X-Files)
 Don Knotts (as Barney Fife from The Andy Griffith Show)
 Gavin MacLeod (as Captain Merrill Stubing from The Love Boat)
 Hugh Downs
 Hugh Grant
 Isaac Hanson
 James Stewart
 John F. Kennedy
 John Stamos
 Kenneth Starr
 Paul Reiser
 Tom Cruise

Catch phrases
 "You ain't gettin' none a' this, none a' this and especially none of THIS" - Vonda Parker (The Parker Sisters)
 "I will break your back, like so, with my knee!!" - El Asso Wipo

Television projects
Since MADtv, Hogan has made a number of television appearances on shows such as 3rd Rock from the Sun, Martin Short's Primetime Glick, Just Shoot Me!, Grounded for Life as Mr. Kersey, and on The Sopranos as Meadow's advisor at Columbia University.

Television

References

External links
 

Living people
American stand-up comedians
American male television actors
American impressionists (entertainers)
Male actors from New York (state)
American sketch comedians
Trinity College (Connecticut) alumni
Comedians from New York (state)
Year of birth missing (living people)